Shannon Bloedel was an American Paralympian sit-skier. She won an Olympic silver medal in the 1992 Paralympics. Bloedel then became a model for Nordstrom.

Description
An accident when she was aged ten left Bloedel without the use of her legs. She decided to ski whilst attending the University of Washington and joined the national team in 1987.

She won gold medals at the National Championships in the US and Canada in 1991. At the 1992 Winter Paralympics Bloedel took a silver medal at Albertville in the Giant Slalom coming second to Marit Ruth whose time was 2:36:78. Teammate Candace Cable of the USA came third.

Bloedel did some modelling of clothes. She became pregnant and retired from skiing to live with husband and children in Seattle.

References

Paralympic gold medalists for the United States
Alpine skiers at the 1992 Winter Paralympics
Living people
Sit-skiers
Skiers from Seattle
Medalists at the 1992 Winter Paralympics
People with paraplegia
American female alpine skiers
Year of birth missing (living people)
Paralympic medalists in alpine skiing
Paralympic alpine skiers of the United States
21st-century American women